Kozhay-Ikskiye Vershiny (Kojay-Iqbaşı) is a rural locality (a selo) in Mikhaylovsky Selsoviet, Bizhbulyaksky District, Bashkortostan, Russia. The population was 275 as of 2010. There are 6 streets.

Geography 
Kozhay-Ikskiye Vershiny is located 30 km northwest of Bizhbulyak (the district's administrative centre) by road. Kozhay-Maximovo and Ignashkino are the nearest rural localities.

References 

Rural localities in Bizhbulyaksky District